A Terra de Caldelas is a comarca in the Galician Province of Ourense. The overall population of this  local region is 2,789 (2019).

Municipalities
Castro Caldelas, Montederramo, Parada de Sil and A Teixeira.

References 

Comarcas of the Province of Ourense